During the 2003–04 season, Crewe Alexandra participated in the Football League First Division, their 81st in the English Football League.

Season summary
Crewe finished in 18th place, a satisfactory position for a side returning to the First Division. Striker Dean Ashton scored 19 goals to make him the league's fourth-highest scorer, attracting attention from many larger clubs.

Kit
Reebok remained Crewe's kit manufacturers, and introduced a new kit for the season. L. C. Charles continued as kit sponsors for the sixth consecutive season.

Final league table

Results
Crewe Alexandra's score comes first

Legend

Football League First Division

FA Cup

League Cup

Squad

Left club during season

Transfers

In
  Adie Moses –  Barnsley, free, 8 July
  Anthony Tonkin –  Stockport County, £150,000, August
  Allan Smart –  Dundee United

Out
  Dave Walton –  Derby County, free

Top scorers
  Dean Ashton, 19
  Steve Jones, 15

References

Crewe Alexandra F.C. seasons
Crewe Alexandra